Cláudio Roberto Siqueira Fernandes Filho (born 21 June 1980), or simply Cláudio, is a Brazilian footballer.

Biography
Born in Londrina, Paraná, Cláudio played once for Goiás in 2001 Copa do Brasil. In November 2001 he signed a 5-year contract with Iraty. He played for the team at 2003 Copa do Brasil. In 2004, he was loaned to Paraná and played 21 matches in 2004 Campeonato Brasileiro Série A.

In January 2005 he left for Inter de Limeira, signed a contract until the end of 2005 Campeonato Paulista, which the club relegated. In May, he was loaned to Paysandu but only played 6 league matches. In September, he was loaned to Prudentópolis of Campeonato Paranaense Série Prata (Paraná state 2nd level).

In December 2005 he left for CSA, signed a contract until the end of 2006 Campeonato Alagoano. In July, he was signed by Ituiutaba, league rival of CSA in 2006 Campeonato Brasileiro Série C. He played 11 out of possible 12 matches, scored once.

In September 2006 he was signed by Atlético Mineiro, at first contracted until the end of season. He played 6 matches in national second level, half of them were one of the starting XI. After winning 2006 Campeonato Brasileiro Série B, he extended his contract until the end of 2007 Campeonato Mineiro, and extended again in June, signed a new 3-year deal.

In August 2008 he was loaned to Atlético Goianiense.

Honours
Campeonato Brasileiro Série B: 2006
Campeonato Brasileiro Série C: 2008

References

External links
 
 Cláudio at CBF 
 
 Cláudio at Placar  
 
 
 

1980 births
Living people
Brazilian footballers
Club Athletico Paranaense players
Iraty Sport Club players
Goiás Esporte Clube players
Paraná Clube players
Associação Atlética Internacional (Limeira) players
Paysandu Sport Club players
Centro Sportivo Alagoano players
Clube Atlético Mineiro players
Sportspeople from Londrina
Association football fullbacks